Frank Dietrich (3 May 1966 in Guben – 24 July 2011) was a German politician and member of the CDU. He was a member of the final East German Volkskammer (People's Chamber) before reunification and from 1990 to 1994 was a member of the Landtag of Brandenburg.

References 

1966 births
2011 deaths
People from Guben
Christian Democratic Union (East Germany) politicians
Christian Democratic Union of Germany politicians
Members of the Landtag of Brandenburg